Thomas Stuart Chambers (born 22 May 1977) is an English actor, known for his role as Sam Strachan in the BBC medical dramas Holby City and Casualty,  Max Tyler in BBC drama series Waterloo Road and Inspector Sullivan in Father Brown. He also won the sixth series of Strictly Come Dancing with his partner Camilla Dallerup.

Early life
Chambers was born and raised in a small village called Darley Dale in Derbyshire and was educated at Repton School.

Career
Chambers attended the National Youth Music Theatre and Guildford School of Acting. He has starred opposite Matthew Rhys and Kate Ashfield in the British film Fakers.

Chambers' interest in dance led him to recreate the sequence from the 1937 RKO film A Damsel in Distress in which Fred Astaire tap dances with a drum kit. The video was sent to casting directors and led to Chambers gaining a part in Holby City as cardiothoracic registrar Sam Strachan. A video of the performance was posted on YouTube prior to his appearance on BBC's Strictly Come Dancing. He later uploaded a video diary of his rehearsals for the recording. When he left Holby City, the programme honoured him with a montage of his three years' work.

In May 2009, it was announced by Denise Welch on Loose Women that Chambers would be joining the fifth series of BBC drama, Waterloo Road as new Executive Head Teacher, Max Tyler, where he appeared in ten episodes.

Chambers narrates the series The Real A&E broadcast daily on Sky One. In November 2011, Chambers starred in the stage version tour of Top Hat. Tom was interviewed in June 2012 with questions about his career and in particular his role in Top Hat

In 2014–2015, Chambers portrayed Inspector Sullivan in the BBC TV's Father Brown in Series 2 and 3. He reprised the role in Series 7 and 8, before returning as a regular in Series 10.

In 2017–2018, Chambers returned to singing and dancing, starring as Bobby Child alongside Clare Sweeney and Charlotte Wakefield, touring the UK in the Watermill production of the George and Ira Gershwin musical,Crazy For You.

Strictly Come Dancing
Chambers competed in and won the sixth series of Strictly Come Dancing, paired with professional dancer Camilla Dallerup. The pair opened the series by performing the cha-cha-cha and scored 28 points. After being on top of the leaderboard twice in the series (joint first place with Lisa Snowdon in Week 5 and joint first with Snowdon and Cherie Lunghi in week 8), Chambers made it to the semi-finals of the competition, seeing off his apparently biggest challenger Austin Healey, with whom he shared a friendly rivalry. It was here, however, that Chambers' participation looked most in doubt, as he finished bottom of the leaderboard. However, he was reprieved when it became clear that a tie between the other two couples at the top of the leaderboard meant that there was no way for him to be saved from the dance-off, leading the BBC to put all three couples through to the final. In the final, Chambers beat Lisa Snowdon into third place, before competing head to head with Rachel Stevens in the final round, where his show dance with Dallerup was greatly praised by the judges. It was announced that Chambers and Dallerup had gained the most public votes and won the show, making Chambers the third male winner of Strictly Come Dancing. It was Dallerup's first win on the show. On Christmas Day 2008, Chambers returned to partner Dallerup in the Christmas special; however, they came second from bottom of the leaderboard and were not voted into the final two by the studio audience. The pair have since appeared on the Strictly Come Dancing tour in early 2009 dancing the quickstep and the samba. In 2015, Chambers participated in the Christmas special, with professional dancer, Oti Mabuse.

Waterloo Road
In May 2009, Chambers joined the cast of the BBC Drama Waterloo Road. His first episode was episode 1 of the fifth series which first aired the week of 25 October 2009 portraying Executive headmaster Max Tyler, who is brought in to oversee the merger of Waterloo Road with local private school John Fosters. His distorted personality is progressively revealed, which climaxes in episode 5.10 where his true colours are finally revealed (when he hits a student) to the relief of the large majority of the school community, which results in his suspension.

Stage
Chambers originated the role of Jerry Travers in the UK production of Top Hat. The show opened on 16 August 2011 at the Milton Keynes Theatre, touring the United Kingdom before transferring to the Aldwych Theatre in London's West End. Chambers left the production on 4 February 2013.

In October 2019, it was announced that Chambers would star in the new touring production of Dial M for Murder as Tony Wendice.

Personal life
In December 2000, Chambers came close to death when the British Airways flight on which he was travelling from London to Nairobi was disrupted in a hijack attempt. Paul Mukonyi, a 27-year-old mental patient from Kenya, burst into the cockpit of the Boeing 747. The pilots recovered control of the aircraft and all passengers landed safely. Chambers described this as "the most terrifying experience of my life". It was this flight that caused him to seek out his teenage sweetheart, Clare Harding, and propose. The couple married in October 2008 in Derbyshire, having to change the date due to his commitments in Strictly Come Dancing.

In 2008, Chambers took part in the Great Walk to Beijing organised by singer Olivia Newton-John in aid of breast cancer awareness and research.

Filmography

Film

Television

References
13. In 2015 he was a judge on the arena tour of Strictly Come Dancing

External links

1977 births
Living people
Alumni of the Guildford School of Acting
English male television actors
People educated at Repton School
People from Darley Dale
Strictly Come Dancing winners